Stanovoy (masculine), Stanovaya (feminine), or Stanovoye (neuter) is the name of several  rural localities in Russia.

Belgorod Oblast
As of 2022, four rural localities in Belgorod Oblast bear this name:
Stanovoye, Borisovsky District, Belgorod Oblast, a khutor in Strigunovsky Rural Okrug of Borisovsky District
Stanovoye, Chernyansky District, Belgorod Oblast, a selo in Chernyansky District
Stanovoye (Solontsinskoye Rural Settlement), Veydelevsky District, Belgorod Oblast, a khutor in Veydelevsky District; municipally, a part of Solontsinskoye Rural Settlement of that district
Stanovoye (Nikolayevskoye Rural Settlement), Veydelevsky District, Belgorod Oblast, a khutor in Veydelevsky District; municipally, a part of Nikolayevskoye Rural Settlement of that district

Ivanovo Oblast
As of 2022, three rural localities in Ivanovo Oblast bear this name:
Stanovoye, Ivanovsky District, Ivanovo Oblast, a village in Ivanovsky District
Stanovoye, Komsomolsky District, Ivanovo Oblast, a village in Komsomolsky District
Stanovoye, Rodnikovsky District, Ivanovo Oblast, a village in Rodnikovsky District

Kaliningrad Oblast
As of 2022, one rural locality in Kaliningrad Oblast bears this name:
Stanovoye, Kaliningrad Oblast, a settlement in Zhilinsky Rural Okrug of Nemansky District

Kaluga Oblast
As of 2022, one rural locality in Kaluga Oblast bears this name:
Stanovoye, Kaluga Oblast, a village in Iznoskovsky District

Kurgan Oblast
As of 2022, two rural localities in Kurgan Oblast bear this name:
Stanovoye, Kurgan Oblast, a selo in Stanovskoy Selsoviet of Tselinny District
Stanovaya, Kurgan Oblast, a village in Stanovskoy Selsoviet of Ketovsky District

Kursk Oblast
As of 2022, three rural localities in Kursk Oblast bear this name:
Stanovoye, Cheremisinovsky District, Kursk Oblast, a village in Yefremovsky Selsoviet of Cheremisinovsky District
Stanovoye, Ponyrovsky District, Kursk Oblast, a selo in Stanovskoy Selsoviet of Ponyrovsky District
Stanovoye, Timsky District, Kursk Oblast, a selo in Stanovskoy Selsoviet of Timsky District

Lipetsk Oblast
As of 2022, one rural locality in Lipetsk Oblast bears this name:
Stanovoye, Lipetsk Oblast, a selo in Stanovlyansky Selsoviet of Stanovlyansky District

Moscow Oblast
As of 2022, one rural locality in Moscow Oblast bears this name:
Stanovoye, Moscow Oblast, a village in Sofyinskoye Rural Settlement of Ramensky District

Oryol Oblast
As of 2022, five rural localities in Oryol Oblast bear this name:
Stanovoy, Oryol Oblast, a settlement in Novosinetsky Selsoviet of Bolkhovsky District
Stanovoye, Novosilsky District, Oryol Oblast, a selo in Glubkovsky Selsoviet of Novosilsky District
Stanovoye, Stanovo-Kolodezsky Selsoviet, Orlovsky District, Oryol Oblast, a village in Stanovo-Kolodezsky Selsoviet of Orlovsky District
Stanovoye, Stanovskoy Selsoviet, Orlovsky District, Oryol Oblast, a village in Stanovskoy Selsoviet of Orlovsky District
Stanovoye, Zalegoshchensky District, Oryol Oblast, a village in Bortnovsky Selsoviet of Zalegoshchensky District

Sverdlovsk Oblast
As of 2022, one rural locality in Sverdlovsk Oblast bears this name:
Stanovaya, Sverdlovsk Oblast, a settlement under the administrative jurisdiction of the Town of Beryozovsky

Tula Oblast
As of 2022, one rural locality in Tula Oblast bears this name:
Stanovaya, Tula Oblast, a village in Yaltinsky Rural Okrug of Volovsky District

Vologda Oblast
As of 2022, five rural localities in Vologda Oblast bear this name:
Stanovoye (crossing loop), Lezhsky Selsoviet, Gryazovetsky District, Vologda Oblast, a crossing loop in Lezhsky Selsoviet of Gryazovetsky District
Stanovoye (village), Lezhsky Selsoviet, Gryazovetsky District, Vologda Oblast, a village in Lezhsky Selsoviet of Gryazovetsky District
Stanovoye, Vokhtogsky Selsoviet, Gryazovetsky District, Vologda Oblast, a village in Vokhtogsky Selsoviet of Gryazovetsky District
Stanovoye, Mezhdurechensky District, Vologda Oblast, a village in Sheybukhtovsky Selsoviet of Mezhdurechensky District
Stanovaya, Vologda Oblast, a village in Andreyevsky Selsoviet of Vashkinsky District

Voronezh Oblast
As of 2022, one rural locality in Voronezh Oblast bears this name:
Stanovoy, Voronezh Oblast, a khutor in Semeyskoye Rural Settlement of Podgorensky District